The Montroc avalanche occurred on February 9, 1999, 14:20 local time. Twelve people died in the avalanche, and multiple structures were either damaged or completely destroyed due to the massive force. The avalanche was said to be one of the most destructive to ever occur in the French Alps since the 1970 Val-d'Isère avalanche.

Geography 
The Peclerey slope wherein the avalanche occurred consisted of two convex slopes of slides, one starting at 2450 meters which ends at 1947 meters halfway down the entire slope, and the second slope wherein another avalanche could have occurred starts at around 1700 meters and ends at the very bottom of the slope. The end of the slope slightly curves upward from the bed of the Arve river towards the road and the local communities. Surprisingly, the angle from the top of the slope to the road was measured at 25 degrees which would have resulted in the avalanche of having a smoother and less intense run weakening the avalanche.

Weather conditions of Chamonix before and during the avalanche 
At the beginning of the year the winter had been dry but enough to plan opening up the local ski resorts in Le Tour and Chamonix early. The anticipated snow finally arrived on January 26, covering up Le Tour and Chamonix in 1 meter thick snow. Then after, the conditions in the area became dry once again. However, on February 7, a depression crossed France covering up Chamonix and nearby communes in 2 meter thick snow over the next three days. A storm of this magnitude had never been said seen since 1978.

Avalanche 
In the valley above the towns had become a bowl of snow piling up due to the heavy snowfall. The snow had risen to about 2450 at the peak of the slope. Multiple skiing resorts across the French-Swiss border were forced to closed due to the ongoing risks of a potential avalanche near the alps. As the conditions became more dangerous, rumors had begun to spread as well, claiming that multiple snow slides had already damaged a skiing lift in Le Tour.

At around 2:40 in the afternoon, as the local authorities were discussing on plans of evacuating the people, a piece of snow which was 1.5 meters deep with an area of 30 hectares had overflowed from the valley until it reached the edge of the slope and started its travel towards the hamlet of Montroc. The avalanche traveled at a maximum speed of 60 mph(almost 100 km/h), accelerating faster as it headed towards the hamlet. It had grown to a size of 300,000 cubic meters of snow as it traversed through the slopes. When it finally crashed down unto Montroc, more than 100,000 tonnes of snow had covered the entirety of Chamonix at a maximum depth of 5 meters deep.

Damage and casualties 
The violent force of the avalanche caused widespread damage across Chamonix, especially Montroc. According to records, 14 buildings were completely destroyed while 6 other structures only sustained minor to severe damage. 20 cabins were also said to have been destroyed by the avalanche, mostly near the Chamonix ski resort. Most homes that were newly built were near the paths of the avalanche suffered greatly. Not only were buildings covered underneath the snow, multiple people were also buried by the avalanche. As rescue efforts began searching for survivors or bodies that were under the snow, 12 people have been found to have died.

Impacts 
The consequences from the avalanche could have been less worse if it weren't for the poor planning from the committees and authorities. The mayor of Chamonix at the time was sentenced to prison for 3 months for second degree murder and involuntary homicide for the 12 deaths caused by the avalanche and for not having to evacuate the chalets on time. A representative of the families of those who died from the avalanches spoke out saying a reminder of the mayors of neighboring communes that they have much more important priorities than organizing festivals during times like these. After the disaster, planning towards avoiding natural disasters were taken much more seriously and mapping of avalanche hazard zones were studied on more. A small memorial was made in front of the Peclerey slope in memory of the lives lost in the avalanche, a cross surrounded by slabs of stone.

See also 

 List of avalanches by death toll
 Montroc
 1970 Val-d'Isère avalanche

References 

1990s avalanches
1999 natural disasters
1999 in France
Death in France
French Alps
Chamonix